The 2009 Pep Boys Auto 500 was a NASCAR Sprint Cup Series stock car race that was held on September 6, 2009 at Atlanta Motor Speedway in Hampton, Georgia. Contested over 325 laps, it was the twenty-fifth race of the 2009 Sprint Cup Series season. Kasey Kahne, driving for Richard Petty Motorsports, won the race, while Kevin Harvick and Juan Pablo Montoya finished second and third respectively.

Race results

References

Pep Boys Auto 500
Pep Boys Auto 500
NASCAR races at Atlanta Motor Speedway
September 2009 sports events in the United States